Rebecca Pidgeon (born October 10, 1965) is an American actress who has appeared on stage and in feature films, and a singer, songwriter and recording artist.

Early life
Pidgeon was born to English parents in Cambridge, Massachusetts, while her father, Carl R. Pidgeon, was a visiting professor at MIT. Her mother, Elaine, is a yoga teacher. Her paternal grandmother, Monica Pidgeon, the editor of Architectural Design, was the sister of artist Olga Lehmann and academic Andrew George Lehmann.

Pidgeon moved to Edinburgh, Scotland in 1970 with her parents. She graduated from the Royal Academy of Dramatic Art in London with classmates Clive Owen and Liza Tarbuck.

Career
From 1986 to 1990, Pidgeon was the lead singer of the British folk/pop band Ruby Blue. She left the group shortly after they signed to a major record label.

She appeared in her first feature film, The Dawning, in 1988; then starred in David Mamet's plays and films, beginning with the movie Homicide and the play Oleanna, a part Mamet wrote for her. She composed the music for the film version, which starred Debra Eisenstadt in her role.

She released the album The Raven in 1994, followed by The New York Girls' Club (1996), and The Four Marys (1998), a collection of traditional Celtic folk songs. Tough on Crime (2005) featured Walter Becker of Steely Dan on guitar and Billy Preston on keyboards. Behind the Velvet Curtain (2008) included a cover version of the Beach Boys song "Wouldn't It Be Nice". Slingshot was released in 2012.

Pidgeon has had roles in additional Mamet films, including The Spanish Prisoner (1997), The Winslow Boy (1999), State and Main (2000), Heist (2001) and Redbelt (2008). She had a supporting role in Red (2010). In the 2013 television movie Phil Spector, she played a supporting role and also sang "Spanish Harlem" over the closing credits. She appeared in the U.S. television series The Unit as Charlotte Ryan, and in the 2007 television film Jesse Stone: Sea Change as Leeann Lewis, a murder/bank robbery suspect.

Personal life
Pidgeon is married to American writer and director David Mamet, whom she met while appearing in his play Speed-the-Plow at the National Theatre, London. Mamet was married to actress Lindsay Crouse at the time. After beginning a relationship with Pidgeon, Mamet divorced Crouse in 1990 and married Pidgeon in 1991.

Pidgeon and Mamet have two children, actress Clara and Noah, in addition to Mamet's two older children, Willa and Zosia. Pidgeon, who was born to a non-practising Christian family, has converted to Mamet's Jewish faith.

She holds dual American/British citizenship.

Discography
 The Raven (Chesky, 1994)
 The New York Girls' Club (Chesky, 1996)
 The Four Marys (Chesky, 1998)
 Tough on Crime (Fuel 2000, 2005)
 Behind the Velvet Curtain (Great American Music, 2008)
 Slingshot (Toy Canteen, 2011)
 Blue Dress On (Toy Canteen, 2013)
 Bad Poetry (Toy Canteen, 2014)
 Sudden  Exposure to Light (Toy Canteen, 2019)
 Parts Of Speech Pieces Of Sound (Toy Canteen, 2022)

With Ruby Blue
 Glances Askances (Red Flame, 1987) 
 Down From Above (Fontana, 1990)
 Broken Water (Red Flame 1992)
 Remasters (Universal 2011)

As guest
 Luciana Souza, Tide (Verve, 2009) 
 Madeleine Peyroux, Bare Bones (Rounder, 2009)
 Chris Connelly, Decibels from Heart (Cleopatra, 2015)

Filmography

Film

Television

References

External links

 

1965 births
Actresses from Cambridge, Massachusetts
Musicians from Cambridge, Massachusetts
Alumni of RADA
American emigrants to Scotland
American people of English descent
American people of French descent
American people of Scottish descent
Converts to Judaism from Christianity
Jewish American actresses
Scottish film actresses
Scottish television actresses
Scottish stage actresses
20th-century Scottish women singers
Scottish folk singers
Scottish singer-songwriters
Living people
21st-century American Jews
21st-century Scottish women singers
21st-century American women